This article presents lists of the literary events and publications in 1589.

Events
January – The Children of Paul's perform twice at the English royal court during the first two weeks of the year.
March – Marprelate Controversy: Bishop Thomas Cooper's Admonition prompts Marprelate's response in the form of a tract entitled Hay any Worke for Cooper.
July – John Penry's printing press produces two tracts purporting to be by sons of Martin Marprelate, but probably by Martin himself: Theses Martinianae by "Martin Junior", and The Just Censure of Martin Junior by "Martin Senior".
1588–1589 – This is the earliest probable date for the composition of Christopher Marlowe's The Tragicall History of the Life and Death of Doctor Faustus and its first performance, in London.

New books

Prose
Jane Anger – 
Thoinot Arbeau – Orchésographie
Giovanni Botero –  (The Reason of State)
Robert Greene – Menaphon
Richard Hakluyt – The Principal Navigations, Voiages, Traffiques and Discoueries of the English Nation, vol. 1
John Lyly (attr.) – Pappe with an Hatchet (Part of the Marprelate Controversy)
George Puttenham (probable author) – Tne Arte of English Poesie
Lorenzo Scupoli – Il combattimento spirituale
Water Margin (水浒传, Shui Hu Zhuan; earliest known complete printed edition)

Drama
Girolamo Bargagli – La Pellegrina (The Pilgrim Woman)
Robert Greene – Friar Bacon and Friar Bungay
Thomas Kyd? – Hamlet (the "Ur-Hamlet", latest date)
Christopher Marlowe – The Jew of Malta (probably written 1589–90)
George Peele? – The Troublesome Reign of King John (approximate year)
The Rare Triumphs of Love and Fortune (anonymous; published)

Poetry
Anne Dowriche (AD) – The French Historie
Christopher Marlowe – The Passionate Shepherd to His Love

Births
March 3 – Gisbertus Voetius, Dutch Calvinist theologian (died 1676)
Unknown dates
Heinrich Petraeus, German physician and writer (died 1620)
Antonio de León Pinelo, Peru-born Spanish historian (died c. 1675)

Deaths
March 22 – Lodovico Guicciardini, Italian merchant and writer (born 1521)
March 23 – Marcin Kromer, Polish historian (born 1512)
July 1 – Christophe Plantin, French-born Dutch printer (born c. 1520)
August 31 – Jurij Dalmatin, Slovenian writer and translator (born c. 1547)
September 16 – Michael Baius, Belgian theologian (born 1513)
September 19 – Jean-Antoine de Baïf, French poet (born 1532)
October 12 – Samuel de Medina, Talmudist and author from Thessaloniki (born 1505)
October 15 – Jacopo Zabarella, Italian philosopher (born 1532)
Unknown date – Thomas Sampson, English theologian and translator (born c. 1517)

References

Years of the 16th century in literature